20 Dartmouth Hill is a Grade II listed building at 20 Dartmouth Hill, Blackheath, London, SE10.

The house dates from the late 18th century. It was lived in by the meteorologist and aeronaut James Glaisher FRS (1809-1903).

References

Blackheath, London
Grade II listed houses in London
Grade II listed buildings in the Royal Borough of Greenwich
Houses in the Royal Borough of Greenwich
Houses completed in the 18th century